Puracé is an andesitic stratovolcano located in the Puracé National Natural Park in the Cauca Department, Colombia. It is part of the North Volcanic Zone of the Andean Volcanic Belt. The volcano is located at the intersection of the Coconucos and Morras Faults.

It is one of the most active volcanoes in Colombia. Large explosive eruptions occurred in 1849, 1869, 1885, 1949, 1950, 1956, and 1957. There were about a dozen eruptions in the 20th century, the most recent being in 1977. Fumaroles were seen near the summit in 1990, and hot springs emerged from some of the lower slopes.



Panorama

See also 
 List of volcanoes in Colombia
 List of volcanoes by elevation

References

Bibliography

External links 
 

Mountains of Colombia
Stratovolcanoes of Colombia
Active volcanoes
Andean Volcanic Belt
Biosphere reserves of Colombia
19th-century volcanic events
20th-century volcanic events
Holocene stratovolcanoes
Quaternary Colombia
Geography of Cauca Department
Four-thousanders of the Andes